Henriette Nissen-Saloman ( Nissen; 18 January 1819 – 27 August 1879), was a Swedish opera singer (mezzo-soprano) and singing teacher.

Henriette Nissen was born in Gothenburg, where she was a student of the organist .  In 1838, she traveled to Paris in 1838, where she took singing lessons from Manuel Garcia and piano lessons from Frédéric Chopin.  She debuted as Elvira in Don Juan at the Comédie-Italienne in Paris in 1842.   She toured Europe from 1844 to 1855 before she was employed at the Italian Opera at Saint Petersburg in Russia in 1859, where she was an instructor at the conservatory until 1873.   She was elected to the Royal Swedish Academy of Music in 1870, and awarded the Litteris et Artibus in 1871.   She married the Danish composer Siegfried Saloman in 1850.

References 
 Österberg, Carin et al., Svenska kvinnor: föregångare, nyskapare. Lund: Signum 1990.

External links 
 Biography, Jewishencyclopedia.com. Accessed 29 November 2022.

1819 births
1879 deaths
Swedish operatic mezzo-sopranos
Jewish singers
Swedish Jews
Voice teachers
19th-century Swedish women opera singers
Litteris et Artibus recipients
Pupils of Frédéric Chopin
19th-century Jews